Roger Conant Cramton (May 18, 1929 – February 3, 2017) was appointed by President Richard M. Nixon to be chairman of the Administrative Conference of the United States in 1970, and in 1972 became the assistant attorney general in charge of the Office of Legal Counsel in the Department of Justice. He is known for standing up to Nixon during the Watergate scandal. He became the Dean of Cornell Law School in 1973. He was also appointed by President Gerald Ford to be the first chairman of the Legal Services Corporation, a post that Hillary Clinton filled immediately after Cramton's tenure there.

Education and career 
Cramton graduated from Harvard University magna cum laude, with an A.B. in 1950. He earned his J.D. degree from the University of Chicago Law School in 1955. He served a law clerk to associate justice Harold Hitz Burton of the Supreme Court of the United States from 1956 to 1957.

Personal 
He was married to Harriet until his death in 2017. He had four children, Ann Kopinski, Charles Cramton, Peter Cramton, and Cutter Cramton. He also had two sisters, 11 grandchildren and 21 great-grandchildren.

See also 
 List of law clerks of the Supreme Court of the United States (Seat 8)

References 

1929 births
2017 deaths
20th-century American lawyers
American legal writers
Cornell University faculty
Harvard University alumni
Law clerks of the Supreme Court of the United States
Nixon administration personnel
United States Assistant Attorneys General for the Office of Legal Counsel
University of Chicago alumni